Hemigobius is a genus of gobies native to the western Pacific Ocean.

Species
There are currently two recognized species in this genus:
 Hemigobius hoevenii (Bleeker, 1851)
 Hemigobius mingi (Herre, 1936)

References

Gobionellinae